This list of compositions by Robert Simpson is a list of the musical compositions of Robert Simpson sorted by genre.

Symphonies 
Robert Simpson is said to have written and destroyed four Symphonies (one of which even used serial procedures) before his first published Symphony. He submitted his official 

 Symphony No. 1 (1951), doctorate thesis for the University of Durham
 Symphony No. 2 (1955–1956), dedicated to Anthony Bernard
 Symphony No. 3 (1962), dedicated to Havergal Brian
 Symphony No. 4 (1970–1972), commissioned by the Hallé Orchestra
 Symphony No. 5 (1972), dedicated to the London Symphony Orchestra
 Symphony No. 6 (1977), dedicated to the renowned gynecologist Ian Craft
 Symphony No. 7 (1977), dedicated to Hans Keller and his wife, the artist Milein Cosman
 Symphony No. 8 (1981), dedicated to the painter Anthony Dorrell
 Symphony No. 9 (1985–1987), dedicated to his wife, Angela
 Symphony No. 10 (1988), dedicated to Vernon Handley
 Symphony No. 11 (1990), dedicated to Matthew Taylor

String quartets 
Simpson composed 15 numbered string quartets; a quartet preceding this sequence was written as part of his course at Durham University and may still exist there. He regarded Quartets No. s 1 - 3 as forming a natural sequence, and No. s 4 - 6 are a clearly distinct group related to three Beethoven quartets, though they can all be performed as entirely independent compositions.

 String Quartet No. 1 (1951–1952)
 String Quartet No. 2 (1953)
 String Quartet No. 3 (1953–1954)
 String Quartet No. 4 (1973), dedicated to Basil Lam
 String Quartet No. 5 (1974), dedicated to Angela Musgrave
 String Quartet No. 6 (1975), dedicated to the film-maker Barrie Gavin and his wife Jamila
 String Quartet No. 7 (1977), dedicated to the organist Susi Jeans and written in celebration of the birth-centenary of her husband, the astronomer Sir James Jeans
 String Quartet No. 8 (1979), dedicated to the biologist and entomologist J.D. Gillett and his wife
 String Quartet No. 9 (1982) is subtitled 32 Variations and Fugue on a Theme of Haydn and was dedicated to the Delmé Quartet, who commissioned it, on their 20th anniversary, which was also the 250th anniversary of the birth of Haydn
 String Quartet No. 10 (1983) bears the title For Peace and was composed for the tenth anniversary of the Coull Quartet
 String Quartet No. 11 (1984), also written for the Coull Quartet
 String Quartet No. 12 (1987) was commissioned for the 1988 Nottingham Festival
 String Quartet No. 13 (1989) was commissioned for the 1990 Cardiff Festival and was premiered there by the Delmé Quartet. It is dedicated to the BBC producer Graham Melville-Mason and his wife Alex.
 String Quartet No. 14 (1990)
 String Quartet No. 15 (1991)

Concerti
 Violin Concerto (1959)
 Piano Concerto (1967)
 Flute Concerto (1989)
 Cello Concerto (1991)

Other orchestral music
 Allegro Deciso for Strings (1954)
 Variations on a Theme of Carl Nielsen for Orchestra (1983)
 Variations and Fugue on a theme by Bach for strings (Saraband) (1991)
 Variations on Happy Birthday (for William Walton's Birthday)(Date Unknown)

Other chamber music
 Variations and Fugue for Recorder and String Quartet (1959) - thought to be lost but reconstructed in 2000 from parts by John B. Turner.
 Trio for Clarinet, Cello and Piano (1967)
 Quintet for Clarinet and String Quartet (1968)
 Quartet for Horn, Violin, Cello and Piano (1975)
 Quintet for Clarinet, Bass Clarinet and String Trio (1981)
 Trio for Horn, Violin and Piano (1984)
 Sonata for Violin and Piano (1984)
 String Trio (1987)
 String Quintet No. 1 (1987)
 Trio for Violin, Cello and Piano (1988–89)
 Brass Quintet (1989)
 String Quintet No. 2 (1995)

Incidental music
 Incidental music to Ibsen's play The Pretenders (1965)
 Incidental music to Milton's play Samson Agonistes  (1974)
 Entr'acte (Date Unknown)

Vocal
 Media morte in vita sumus (1975) (for chorus, brass and timpani)
 Tempi, for full mixed voice chorus a capella (1987)

Compositions for brass band
 Canzona for Brass (1958)
 Energy (1971), Test Piece, Brass Band World Championships
 Volcano (1979), Test Piece, National Brass Band Championships of Britain
 The Four Temperaments, Suite for Brass Band (1983)
 Introduction and Allegro on a Bass of Max Reger (1987)
 Vortex (1989)

Compositions for keyboard instruments

 Piano Sonata (1946)
 Variations and Finale on a Theme of Haydn for solo piano (1948)
 Sonata for two pianos (1979)
 Michael Tippett, His Mystery for solo piano (1984)
 Eppur si muove, Ricercar and Passacaglia for organ (1985)
 Variations and Finale on a Theme by Beethoven for solo piano (1990)

Arrangements
 Arrangement of Die Kunst der Fuge - Contrapunctus No's 1-13 (Bach/Simpson) (Date Unknown)
 Transcription of Comotio (for piano, four hands) (Nielsen/Simpson) (Date Unknown)

References
Chronological list of the compositions of Robert Simpson - Robert Simpson Society

 
Simpson, Robert